is a Japanese light novel series written by Reki Kawahara and illustrated by HiMA. The series began publication in ASCII Media Works' Dengeki Bunko imprint from February 2009 and is licensed in North America by Yen Press. Two manga series began serialization in Dengeki Bunko Magazine from May 2010, with another series beginning serialization in Dengeki Daioh in January 2013. An anime adaptation by Sunrise aired in Japan between April and September 2012. An English-language version began streaming on Viz Media's Neon Alley service from April 2013. Two video games were released for the PlayStation Portable and PlayStation 3 in September 2012, and January 2013, each containing an original video animation episode. An anime film titled Accel World: Infinite Burst featuring an original story by Kawahara premiered in Japan in July 2016.

Plot

Haruyuki "Haru" Arita is a short, overweight boy who is frequently ridiculed by delinquents at the Umesato Junior High School. Using his Neuro Linker to escape the torment of real life, he logs onto the school's local network cyberspace where he always plays virtual squash alone, and his innate video game skills bring him to the attention of Kuroyukihime (literally meaning "Black Snow Princess"), the school's popular, highly intellectual and attractive female student council vice-president.

After helping him against the delinquents, Kuroyukihime introduces Haruyuki to Brain Burst, a secret program that is able to accelerate the human cognitive process to the point at which time appears to stop. Haruyuki soon learns that Brain Burst is more than just a program, but an augmented-reality massively-multiplayer online (ARMMO) fighting game where people fight each other in fierce duels in order to obtain burst points, which can be spent for acceleration abilities in the real world.

Kuroyukihime then enlists Haruyuki's help in reaching level 10 within Brain Burst by defeating the "Six Kings of Pure Colour" and ultimately meet the creator of Brain Burst to learn its true purpose. With every challenge they face in the accelerated world, Haru and Kuroyukihime, under their aliases "Silver Crow" and "Black Lotus", gather trusted allies and confront treacherous enemies.  Their bond grows stronger while working to attain their ultimate objective: to reach the highest in-game level and meet the game's creator, who will reveal why the game was created and the true purpose of it.

Media

Light novels
Accel World began as a light novel series written by Reki Kawahara and illustrated by HiMA. Originally, Kawahara entered the first novel in the series into ASCII Media Works' 15th Dengeki Novel Prize in 2008 and the novel won the Grand Prize. The first novel was published by ASCII Media Works on February 10, 2009, under their Dengeki Bunko imprint. As of March 2022, 26 volumes have been published. At their Japan Expo USA panel, Yen Press announced the rights to publish the light novels in English. The English version is translated by Jocelyne Allen. The first volume was released on July 22, 2014.

Manga
A manga adaptation titled Accel World illustrated by Hiroyuki Aigamo was serialized between April 10, 2010 and June 9, 2017 in ASCII Media Works' Dengeki Bunko Magazine. The series has been collected in eight tankōbon volumes, released between July 27, 2011, and July 27, 2017. A four-panel comic strip manga titled  illustrated by Ryuryū Akari was serialized between April 10, 2010 and June 10, 2016 in Dengeki Bunko Magazine. Five tankōbon volumes were released between July 27, 2011, and October 26, 2013. In February 2014, Yen Press announced they had licensed Accel World for an English release in North America. The English translation is by Jocelyne Allen. They released the volumes between September 23, 2014 and December 11, 2018. A spin-off manga, Accel World / Dural: Magisa Garden, written by Reki Kawahara and drawn by Ayato Sasakura  was serialized in Monthly Comic Dengeki Daioh (published by ASCII Media Works) from March 2012 to August 2017 and collected in eight volumes. It spotlights female burst linkers who attend a private school, Kiyomi Gakuin, in Nakano, Tokyo. Some of the characters from the main story also appear.

Accel World

Axel World

Accel World / Dural: Magisa Garden

Anime

An anime television series adaptation aired in Japan between April 7, 2012 and September 22, 2012. The opening theme until episode 13 is "Chase the world" by May'n and the ending theme is "→unfinished→" by Kotoko. From episode 14 onwards the opening theme is "Burst the Gravity" by Altima and the ending theme is "unite." by Sachika Misawa. Warner Home Video, ASCII Media Works, Namco Bandai Games, Sunrise and Genco were involved in the production of this adaptation. Viz Media announced the streaming of the anime on Hulu as of April 6, 2012. An English-dubbed version premiered on Viz Media's online streaming service, Neon Alley, on April 19, 2013. An anime film titled Accel World: Infinite Burst featuring an original story by Kawahara was released on July 23, 2016. Hanabee Entertainment has licensed the series alongside Little Busters!, and previously From the New World, Campione! and The Familiar of Zero in May 2014. Muse Communication has licensed the series in Asia-Pacific and is streaming on Muse Asia YouTube channel.

Video games
Two video games based on the series were developed by Banpresto and published by Namco Bandai Games for PlayStation 3 and PlayStation Portable. The first of these, was released in Japan on September 13, 2012. The second one, was released in Japan on January 31, 2013. The limited edition versions of these games include an original video animation of the anime series (Blu-ray Disc for the PS3 version, DVD for the PSP version). In Z.H.P. Unlosing Ranger VS Darkdeath Evilman for PSP, Silver Crow is an unlockable costume. In Sword Art Online: Lost Song, Black Lotus is an obtainable character and is also one of the opponents you can defeat.

An action role-playing game titled Accel World vs. Sword Art Online: Millennium Twilight was announced in October 2016. The game is a crossover with Sword Art Online, developed by Bandai Namco Entertainment for PlayStation 4 and PlayStation Vita and released on July 7, 2017. The Windows PC version was released on September 12, 2017.

Reception
Rebecca Silverman of Anime News Network reviewed the series and gave a story rating of A−, stating a similar basis of Sword Art Online with improved characters. Richard Eisenbeis of Kotaku praised the anime for its well-thought out story, relatable main character, and great villain protagonist, but criticizes the anime for its third arc. At the end, he says that the anime starts out strong, but ends on a weak note.

References

External links
  
 Video game official website 
 

2009 Japanese novels
2010 manga
2012 anime television series debuts
2012 manga
2013 anime OVAs
Fiction set in 2046
Anime and manga based on light novels
Adventure anime and manga
ASCII Media Works manga
Kadokawa Dwango franchises
Bandai Namco franchises
Augmented reality in fiction
Brain–computer interfacing in fiction
Dengeki Bunko
Dengeki Comics
Dengeki Daioh
Fantasy anime and manga
Light novels
Massively multiplayer online role-playing games in fiction
Muse Communication
PlayStation 3 games
PlayStation Portable games
School life in anime and manga
Science fiction anime and manga
Seinen manga
Shōnen manga
Sunrise (company)
Time in fiction
Virtual reality in fiction
Viz Media anime
Yen Press titles